

Compounds by carbon number

1
2
3
4
5
6
7
8
9
10

11
12
13
14
15
16
17
18
19
20

21
22
23
24
25–29
30–39
40–49
50+

See also

IUPAC nomenclature of organic chemistry

References